These are the lists of monuments in Malta found on the National Inventory of the Cultural Property of the Maltese Islands (NICPMI). They are sorted by their location in their respective local council.

List 
 List of monuments in Attard
 List of monuments in Balzan
 List of monuments in Birgu
 List of monuments in Birkirkara
 List of monuments in Birżebbuġa
 List of monuments in Cospicua
 List of monuments in Dingli
 List of monuments in Fgura
 List of monuments in Floriana
 List of monuments in Fontana, Gozo
 List of monuments in Gudja
 List of monuments in Għajnsielem
 List of monuments in Għarb
 List of monuments in Għasri
 List of monuments in Għaxaq
 List of monuments in Gżira
 List of monuments in Ħamrun
 List of monuments in Iklin
 List of monuments in Kalkara
 List of monuments in Kerċem
 List of monuments in Kirkop
 List of monuments in Lija
 List of monuments in Luqa
 List of monuments in Marsa, Malta
 List of monuments in Marsaskala
 List of monuments in Marsaxlokk
 List of monuments in Mdina
 List of monuments in Mellieħa
 List of monuments in Mosta
 List of monuments in Mqabba
 List of monuments in Msida
 List of monuments in Mtarfa
 List of monuments in Munxar
 List of monuments in Mġarr
 List of monuments in Nadur
 List of monuments in Naxxar
 List of monuments in Paola, Malta
 List of monuments in Pembroke, Malta
 List of monuments in Pietà, Malta
 List of monuments in Qala, Malta
 List of monuments in Qormi
 List of monuments in Qrendi
 List of monuments in Rabat, Malta
 List of monuments in Safi, Malta
 List of monuments in San Lawrenz
 List of monuments in San Ġwann
 List of monuments in Sannat
 List of monuments in Santa Venera
 List of monuments in Senglea
 List of monuments in Siġġiewi
 List of monuments in Sliema
 List of monuments in St. Julian's
 List of monuments in St. Paul's Bay
 List of monuments in Tarxien
 List of monuments in Valletta
 List of monuments in Victoria, Gozo
 List of monuments in Xagħra
 List of monuments in Xewkija
 List of monuments in Żabbar
 List of monuments in Żebbuġ
 List of monuments in Żebbuġ, Gozo
 List of monuments in Żejtun
 List of monuments in Żurrieq

References